The Venus comb murex, scientific name Murex pecten, is a species of large predatory sea snail, a marine gastropod mollusk in the family Muricidae, the rock snails or murex snails.
The shell of this Indo-Pacific species has a very long siphonal canal, and numerous spines.

Distribution
This species is native to Indo-Pacific waters.

Shell description

The shell of this snail has an extremely long siphonal canal.

The shell has over one hundred spines, which provide protection from predation, and prevent the snail from sinking in the soft mud. Like many other Murex snails, it feeds on other mollusks.

This is a common species, but perfect specimens of the shell are not easily found because of the fragility of the numerous long spines. The species grows to between 10 and 15 cm in length.

References

External links 

Murex
Gastropods described in 1786